Nichols House may refer to:

in Australia
Nichols House, Eltham, Melbourne

in the United States
(by state then city)
Nichols House (Trinidad, Colorado), listed on the National Register of Historic Places (NRHP) in Las Animas County
George Pickering Nichols House, Thompson, Connecticut, listed on the NRHP in Windham County
Nichols Farms Historic District, Trumbull, Connecticut, listed on the NRHP in Fairfield County
Harry H. Nichols House, Maywood, Illinois, listed on the NRHP in Cook County
J.L. Nichols House and Studio, Bloomington, Indiana, listed on the NRHP in Monroe County
Oscar Nichols House, Davenport, Iowa, listed on the NRHP in Scott County
Samuel Nichols House, Nichols, Iowa, listed on the NRHP
William Anzi Nichols House, Winterset, Iowa, listed on the NRHP
Nichols House (Ponchatoula, Louisiana), listed on the NRHP in Tangipahoa Parish
Capt. John P. Nichols House, Searsport, Maine, listed on the NRHP in Waldo County
Nichols House (Baltimore, Maryland)
Hooper-Lee-Nichols House, Cambridge, Massachusetts, listed on the NRHP
Nichols House (Newton, Massachusetts), listed on the NRHP
Daniel Nichols Homestead, Reading, Massachusetts, listed on the NRHP
James Nichols House, Reading, Massachusetts, listed on the NRHP
John F. Nichols House, Somerville, Massachusetts, listed on the NRHP
Richard Nichols House, Reading, Massachusetts, listed on the NRHP
Nichols-Sterner House, Richmond, Massachusetts, listed on the NRHP
Nichols Farm District, Cedar Grove, Missouri, listed on the NRHP
Marion Nichols Summer Home, Hollis, New Hampshire, listed on the NRHP
William Nichols Cobblestone Farmhouse, Benton, New York, listed on the NRHP
Doc Nichols House, Durham, North Carolina
Walter Nichols House, Elyria, Ohio, listed on the NRHP in Lorain County
Eli Nichols Farm, Howard, Ohio, listed on the NRHP in Coshocton County
John H. Nichols House, Wapakoneta, Ohio, listed on the NRHP in Auglaize County
Nichols House (Dayton, Oregon), listed on the NRHP in Yamhill County
Dr. A. S. Nichols House, Portland, Oregon, listed on the NRHP in Multnomah County
Dr. Herbert S. Nichols House, Portland, Oregon, listed on the NRHP in Multnomah County
Nichols House (East Barre, Vermont), listed on the NRHP in Washington County
Edward Nichols House, Leesburg, Virginia, listed on the NRHP in Loudoun County
John T. and Margaret Nichols House, Allouez, Wisconsin, listed on the NRHP in Brown County
Frank Eugene Nichols House, Onalaska, Wisconsin, listed on the NRHP in La Crosse County